The canton of Le Mortainais is an administrative division of the Manche department, northwestern France. It was created at the French canton reorganisation which came into effect in March 2015. Its seat is in Mortain-Bocage.

It consists of the following communes:

Barenton
Beauficel
Brouains
Chaulieu
Le Fresne-Poret
Gathemo
Ger
Mortain-Bocage
Le Neufbourg
Perriers-en-Beauficel
Romagny-Fontenay
Saint-Barthélemy
Saint-Clément-Rancoudray
Saint-Cyr-du-Bailleul
Saint-Georges-de-Rouelley
Sourdeval
Le Teilleul

References

Cantons of Manche